The Naval, Shipping and Fisheries Exhibition was a world's fair held in Earl's Court London in 1905
 intended to mark the 100th anniversary of the Battle of Trafalgar, where a British fleet led by Admiral Nelson (who died in the battle) defeated a joint Franco-Spanish fleet during the Napoleonic Wars. The president of the exhibition was the lord mayor of London (then Charles Johnston) and the vice president Admiral Edmund Fremantle.

Trafalgar related items included an item labelled as the quilt from Nelson's bed on board ship and a "scenic interpretation" of the battle and death of Nelson

But in addition to Trafalgar commemoration, as the name suggests there were naval, shipping and fishery related exhibits.

Naval related exhibits included Captain Cook's chart rule and his plane table

Fishing displays included the opportunity to observe fishers mending nets and divers in a diving tank.

Shipping related exhibits included an eight foot model of the Empress Queen (which also appeared at the Glasgow and Franco-British fairs) and a village of Amerindians in which war canoes were shown. More actively there was the opportunity to take a submarine trip.

And, as in following Earl's Court exhibitions in the 1900s, there were amusement rides including a Hiram Maxim Captive flying machine and a Shoot-the-Chutes.

See also
 Human Zoo
 Trafalgar 200

References

1905 in London
World's fairs in London